The Men's Single event of the Bowling at the 2017 World Games will be held on 22 July 2017.

Single Men

Qualifications

Competition bracket

Results

References
Qualification
Results

Men